Winspear is a surname. Notable people with the surname include:

Jacqueline Winspear (born 1955), English writer
Violet Winspear (1928–1989), English writer